The 2018 San Jose State Spartans football team represented San Jose State University in the 2018 NCAA Division I FBS football season. The Spartans were led by second-year head coach Brent Brennan and played their home games at CEFCU Stadium. San José State was a member of the Mountain West Conference in the West Division. They finished the season 1–11, 1–7 in Mountain West play to finish in last place in the West Division.

Previous season

San José State fired former head coach Ron Caragher due to Caragher's failure of continuing the success of the 2012 San Jose State Spartans football team. As a result, San José State hired Brent Brennan as the head coach, who was a wide receivers coach at Oregon State. The Spartans came in with a completely new coaching staff, only to finish 2–11 in the season, and 1–7 in conference play.

NFL Draft selections

The Spartans had one individual selected in the 2018 NFL Draft.

Recruiting

Position key

Recruits

The Spartans signed a total of 24 recruits.

Preseason

Award watch lists
Listed in the order that they were released

Mountain West media days
During the Mountain West media days held July 24–25 at the Cosmopolitan on the Las Vegas Strip, the Spartans were predicted to finish in last place in the West Division. They did not have any players selected to the preseason all-Mountain West team.

Media poll

Schedule

Sources:

Game summaries

UC Davis

at Washington State

at Oregon

Hawaii

Colorado State

vs. Army

at San Diego State

UNLV

at Wyoming

at Utah State

Nevada

at Fresno State

Honors

Mountain West

Players drafted into the NFL

References

San Jose State
San Jose State Spartans football seasons
San Jose State Spartans football